Balkan Info is an independent media production company based in Belgrade, Serbia.

It was founded in 2015 by journalist and author Teša Tešanović, who was later joined by Marko Jeremić, Aleksandar Pavković, Ognjen Radosavljević, Nemanja Blagojević and Nemanja Oblaković.

Balkan Info's team has interviewed more than 400 prominent individuals including Milan Gutović, Nele Karajlić, Ljubodrag Simonović, Nebojša Pavković, Draško Stanivuković, Muamer Zukorlić, Ajs Nigrutin and many more. It has been criticized for its interviews with far-right conspiracy theorists and anti-vax activists.

References

External links

YouTube channels launched in 2015
Television stations in Serbia